Robert Aske (24 February 1619 – 27 January 1689) was a merchant and haberdasher in the City of London.  He is remembered primarily for the charitable foundation created from his estate, which nowadays operates two schools in Hertfordshire, Haberdashers' Boys' School and Haberdashers' School for Girls, and others elsewhere.

Life
Aske was the son of an affluent draper.  Aske was apprenticed to John Trott, a haberdasher (dealer in raw silk) and East India Company merchant.  Aske became a Freeman of the Worshipful Company of Haberdashers in 1643 and was elected an Alderman of the City of London in 1666.  From 1671 Aske held £500 of original stock in the slave-trading Royal Africa Company, where he was one of 198 stockholders, entitling him to a single vote. He became Master of the Haberdashers' Company, but was removed from that position by James II in 1687 when the Catholic King lost faith in Aske, a Protestant.

Aske made an investment of £500 (c. £110K today) in the Royal African Company (RAC) in 1672.  This was made under the provisions of the original RAC Charter of 1672 which stipulated that individual investors were entitled to one vote for each £100 share. To be elected an Assistant, or Director, of the RAC, a shareholder had to hold at least £400 of shares. This regulation required those who wished to be entitled to vote as a shareholder in the RAC to show some financial commitment.  Aske may have voted and participated in discussion about policy decisions, but there is no evidence that he was elected as an Assistant, or Director, of the Company.  At the time of his death, his estate included £650 (c. £150K today) of RAC stock.  This represents 1.3% of the total value of his estate. As a result of discussion of Aske's legacy in 2021, his name was dropped from the two Haberdashers' Schools in Elstree, although it was retained by their governing body.

Despite marrying twice, Aske had no children and left the bulk of his sizable estate, £32,000
(equivalent to £55.8m in 2010, against average earnings), to his livery company for charitable purposes.  He directed that £20,000 was to be used to buy a piece of land within one mile of The City upon which was to be built a "hospital" (almshouses) for 20 poor members of the Company and a school for 20 sons of poor Freemen of the Company.  The remaining £12,000 was left to form the Haberdashers' Aske's Foundation, of which the Company is Trustee.  The charity was incorporated by a private Act of Parliament in 1690.

Legacy
An almshouse and school, Haberdashers' Aske's Boys' School, were built on 21 acres in Hoxton by 1692 to a design by Robert Hooke.  A further 1,500 acres (6 km²) in Kent were acquired to provide an annual income of over £700.  The buildings were demolished in 1824 and reconstructed in 1825 to a design by the architect, David Riddell Roper.  The almshouses were closed to enable the school to expand in 1874 to take 300 boys and 300 girls, and a second and third school were opened in Hatcham, Surrey in 1875.  Haberdashers' Aske's School, Hoxton was relocated (Hampstead for the boys and Acton for the girls) in 1898, but both schools were reunited in 1974 at Elstree on adjoining sites.  The Hatcham schools are now merged as a single state school, an Academy known as Haberdashers' Hatcham College.

References

Further reading
Robert Aske I and II
History of the schools
haberdashers.co.uk

1619 births
1689 deaths
17th-century English businesspeople
Councilmen and Aldermen of the City of London
English philanthropists
English merchants
Founders of English schools and colleges
Haberdashers' Schools
Haberdashers
Worshipful Company of Haberdashers
Cloth merchants
17th-century philanthropists